Ercheia niveostrigata is a species of moth of the family Erebidae first described by Warren in 1913. It is found in Taiwan.

References

Moths described in 1913
Ercheiini